Jean Du Castre d'Auvigny was a French soldier and writer born in Hainaut in 1712.

He served with distinction in the chevau-légers and died at the battle of Dettingen on 27 June 1743.

He authored the following books:  
 Mémoires de Madame de Barneveldt (1732, 2vol. in 12)
 Amusements historiques
 Histoire de Paris (jusqu'en 1730)
 Vies des hommes illustres de la France (continued by abbott Gabriel-Louis Pérau and Turpin), 1739–1757, 27 volumes in-12.

He worked in collaboration with abbé Desfontaines and was the actor Préville's step brother.

Sources 
 Jean Du Castre d'Auvigny on Wikisource

1712 births
1743 deaths
18th-century French historians